This is a list of masters of Fitzwilliam College, Cambridge. Fitzwilliam House, the body established in 1869 for non-collegiate students attached to the University of Cambridge, was presided over by a Censor. Once the non-collegiate system was ended and Fitzwilliam College, Cambridge was established as a full college of the university in 1966 the college head became known as the Master.

Censors of Fitzwilliam House, Cambridge

 1869 - 1881 Ralph Benjamin Somerset
 1881 - 1890 Francis George Howard
 1890 - 1907 Tristram Frederick Croft Huddleston
 1907 - 1924 William Fiddian Reddaway
 1924 - 1954 William Sutherland Thatcher
 1955 - 1959 William Washington Williams
 1959 - 1966 Walter Wyatt Grave

Masters of Fitzwilliam College, Cambridge

References

 Cambridge University database
 Fitzwilliam College - Master

Masters
 
Fitzwilliam